Ferrakohn Hall (born September 20, 1990) is an American professional basketball player. He played college basketball for Seton Hall and Memphis.

Professional career
During the 2017–18 season, he competed for the Saitama Broncos of the Japanese B.League. In October 2018, Hall was added to the training camp roster of the Windy City Bulls of the NBA G League. He re-signed with the team in 2019.

On January 26, 2021, Hall signed with Quimsa of the Liga Nacional de Básquet.

On September 17, 2021, Hall signed with Kaohsiung Aquas of the T1 League.

References

External links
 Ferrakohn Hall profile at Real GM

1990 births
Living people
American expatriate basketball people in the Czech Republic
American expatriate basketball people in Denmark
American expatriate basketball people in Japan
American expatriate basketball people in Saudi Arabia
American men's basketball players
Basketball players from Memphis, Tennessee
Centers (basketball)
Iowa Wolves players
Memphis Tigers men's basketball players
Saitama Broncos players
Santa Cruz Warriors players
Seton Hall Pirates men's basketball players
Windy City Bulls players
American expatriate basketball people in Taiwan
Kaohsiung Aquas players
T1 League imports